John Charles Lush (October 8, 1885 – November 18, 1946), was a professional baseball player who was a pitcher in the Major Leagues from 1904 to 1910. He played for the St. Louis Cardinals and Philadelphia Phillies.

On May 1, 1906, while with the Phillies, the 20-year-old Lush no-hit the Brooklyn Superbas 6-0 at Brooklyn's Washington Park, besting Mal Eason—himself a no-hit pitcher on July 20 of that season. Lush struck out 11, walked three, and one runner first base on a Mickey Doolin error. Not until Jim Bunning's perfect game in 1964 would there be another no-hitter by a Phillies pitcher.

Lush was a good hitting pitcher in his seven-year major league career. He posted a .254 batting average (252-for-993) with 107 runs, 40 doubles, 11 triples, 2 home runs, 94 RBI, 28 stolen bases and drawing 69 bases on balls. He was also used at first base and in the outfield.

See also
 List of Major League Baseball no-hitters

References

External links

1885 births
1946 deaths
Major League Baseball pitchers
Philadelphia Phillies players
St. Louis Cardinals players
Sportspeople from Williamsport, Pennsylvania
Williamsport Millionaires players
Toronto Maple Leafs (International League) players
Cleveland Bearcats players
Portland Beavers players
Baseball players from Pennsylvania